Cawthra is a bus rapid transit station on the Mississauga Transitway in central Mississauga, Ontario, Canada. It is located along the north side of Eastgate Parkway on the east side of Cawthra Road.

The first four stations on the Transitway at Central Parkway, Cawthra, Tomken and Dixie, opened on 17 November 2014.

References

External links

Mississauga Transitway
2014 establishments in Ontario